Victoria Reyes-García (born 2 July 1971) is a Spanish scientist who is a professor at the Catalan Institution for Research and Advanced Studies (ICREA). She studies ecological knowledge systems and their contributions on development.

Early life and education 
Reyes-García was born in Barcelona. She started her academic career at the Autonomous University of Barcelona, where she studied history. She moved to Ecuador to complete a graduate degree in Amazonian Studies. In 1995, Reyes-García returned to Spain, where she completed a Master's degree in the International University of Andalucía. She was a doctoral researcher in the United States, working on anthropology at the University of Florida. She was awarded a postdoctoral fellowship from the Wenner-Gren Foundation.

Research and career 
In 2002, Reyes-García was appointed to the faculty at the Heller School for Social Policy and Management. Between 1999 and 2004, Reyes-García lived amongst Tsimané hunter-gatherers in the Amazon rainforest. In 2006 she was made Head of the Laboratory for the Analysis of Socio-Ecological Systems in a Global World. Reyes-García moved to the Catalan Institution for Research and Advanced Studies (ICREA) as a Research Professor in 2008.

Reyes-García's research looks to better understand how climate change impacts physical, biological and social systems, as well as trying to establish how these impacts are perceived locally. In particular, she looks to learn from communities with long histories of interactions with their local environment, and involve their insight in the creation of new policies. For instance, she combines information about the physical impacts of climate change (sea level rise, glacier shrinking), with phenological studies and investigations into public perception of the physical impacts.

Awards and honors 
 2009 Autonomous University of Barcelona Excellency in Research
 2010 European Research Council Starting Grant
 2017 European Research Council Consolidator Grant
 2021 Elected Member of the National Academy of Sciences

Selected publications

Books

References 

Spanish women scientists
Autonomous University of Barcelona alumni
Academic staff of the Autonomous University of Barcelona
People from Barcelona
1971 births
Members of the United States National Academy of Sciences
University of Florida alumni
Spanish scientists
Living people